22nd NSFC Awards
January 4, 1988

Best Film: 
 The Dead 
The 22nd National Society of Film Critics Awards, given on 4 January 1988, honored the best filmmaking of 1987.

Winners

Best Picture 
1. The Dead
2. Hope and Glory
3. The Last Emperor

Best Director 
1. John Boorman – Hope and Glory
2. John Huston – The Dead
3. Juzo Itami – Tampopo

Best Actor 
1. Steve Martin – Roxanne
2. Albert Brooks – Broadcast News
3. Terry O'Quinn – The Stepfather

Best Actress 
1. Emily Lloyd – Wish You Were Here
2. Diane Keaton – Baby Boom
3. Holly Hunter – Broadcast News and Raising Arizona

Best Supporting Actor 
1. Morgan Freeman – Street Smart
2. Sean Connery – The Untouchables
3. Albert Brooks – Broadcast News

Best Supporting Actress 
1. Kathy Baker – Street Smart
2. Vanessa Redgrave – Prick Up Your Ears
3. Anjelica Huston – The Dead

Best Screenplay 
1. John Boorman – Hope and Glory
2. Joel and Ethan Coen – Raising Arizona
3. Juzo Itami – Tampopo

Best Cinematography 
Philippe Rousselot – Hope and Glory

Special Award 
Richard Roud

References

External links
Past Awards

1987
National Society of Film Critics Awards
National Society of Film Critics Awards
National Society of Film Critics Awards